The Negrea is a left tributary of the river Lozova in Romania. It flows into the Lozova in Schela.

References

Rivers of Romania
Rivers of Galați County